James Sayer (July or September 1862 – 1 February 1922) was an English footballer who played 24 times for Stoke and gained one cap with the England national team.

Career
Sayer played for Yorkshire clubs Mexborough, Heeley, The Wednesday and Sheffield before joining Stoke in 1885. He made his League debut on 8 September 1888, as a forward for Stoke in a 2–0 defeat by West Bromwich Albion at the Victoria Ground. and went on to play seven league matches in the 1888–89 scoring one goal in a 1–1 draw against Derby County on 6 April 1889. Sayer also played seven League games in the 1889–90 campaigns before leaving to return to his home town Mexborough.

Style of play
He was dubbed 'Greyhound' by Stoke fans due to his pace.

International career
Sayer made one international appearance for England in a 7–0 win over Ireland in 1887.

Personal life
Sayer was secretary of a Stoke pottery company and he later became the director of Fielding Ltd, a manufacturer of Devon ceramics.

Career statistics

Club

International
Source:

References

1922 deaths
1862 births
People from Mexborough
Footballers from Doncaster
English footballers
England international footballers
Association football outside forwards
Mexborough F.C. players
Heeley F.C. players
Sheffield Wednesday F.C. players
Stoke City F.C. players
English Football League players